Monmouth Mall is an enclosed split level shopping center in Eatontown, New Jersey  located on the corner of the intersection of NJ 35, NJ 36, and Wyckoff Road (Route 547). It is owned Kushner Companies and managed by Westminster Management. The mall is located near the Garden State Parkway at exit 105 and NJ 18 near the former location of the Eatontown Circle.

Anchor stores at the mall are Boscov's, and Macy's.

History 
The mall was built on what was then a farm owned by the Valentino Family of the nearby city of Long Branch, New Jersey. Original anchors of the mall consisted of Bamberger's (at that time a subsidiary of Macy's) and Montgomery Ward. After pulling out of New Jersey, Montgomery Ward became Alexander's in 1975. The mall was enclosed and expanded to its current size in 1975. The older section of the mall continued to have one level while the new expansion included two levels that were anchored by Abraham & Straus, Hahne's and JCPenney as of 1975.

In 1987, the mall was renovated. The renovation brought in new lighting, new flooring, and new glass and chrome handrails along the second level. The renovation also removed the in-floor planters and replaced them with movable planters. The renovation also closed off the entrance near the former arcade on the Wyckoff Road side of the old wing; and raised the lowered seating areas in front of the anchors.

Ashley Tisdale was discovered at the mall in 1989 as a three-year-old.

In 1994–1996, the mall was expanded to include an elevator and a food court (modeled after a Jersey Shore theme) including 1920s style beach photos wrapped around the columns in the older section of the mall, as well as Nobody Beats the Wiz, a new 15-screen Loews Theatres (now AMC). Old Navy to replace the closed Caldor. The mall also saw minor cosmetic changes that consisted of replacing black with sky blue in the color schemes through painting and retiling, as well as new lighting along the pillars.

Through the years, Monmouth Mall has seen many different anchors that have come and gone, however, JCPenney was built by themselves in 1976 and remains to this day. In 1987, the Bamberger's brand was eliminated and the store was renamed for its parent corporation, Macy's. Anchor changes consisted of Caldor replacing Alexander's in 1986, Macy's replacing the former store Bamberger's in 1987, Lord & Taylor replacing the former store Hahne's in 1990, Stern's replacing Abraham & Straus in 1995 and Boscov's replacing Stern's in 2001. In 2010, Planet Fitness opened at Monmouth Mall.

Monmouth Mall went through a significant expansion in 2009. In mid-2010, cosmetic renovations started at the mall including new tile, paint, lighting, and a complete overhaul of the food court. The renovations lasted until summer 2011.

In 2012, Vornado Realty Trust announced plans to sell its portfolio of enclosed shopping malls. In August 2015, Vornado's fifty percent stake and management in the Monmouth Mall was sold to co-owner Kushner Companies for $38 million.

On September 7, 2018, it was announced that Lord & Taylor would be closing as part of a plan to close 10 stores nationwide. The store closed in January 2019. On June 22, 2020, Crate & Barrel opened a temporary close out store on the 1st floor in the former Lord & Taylor space. It has since closed.

In 2021, Brookfield sold the mall to Kushner Companies.

In 2022, the mall announced that the parking garage would be demolished due to structural instability.

In June 2022, it was announced that JCPenney would be closing at the mall in October 2022 which has been at the mall for 47 years opening in 1975 in the mall expansion wing. This left Boscov's and Macy's as the only anchors left.

Redevelopment

In February 2016, Monmouth Mall owner Kushner Companies announced conceptual plans to redevelop the mall into a pedestrian-friendly "live, work and play" development at a cost of approximately $500 million. The development, which would be renamed the "Monmouth Town Center" was proposed to include residential apartments, a hotel, retail space, entertainment, and dining options. The proposal also included an outdoor plaza, green spaces, and a biker- and pedestrian- friendly streetscape. The residential component was intended to include one and two bedroom apartment units to minimize impacts on local traffic and public school systems. Kushner Companies then-CEO Jared Kushner noted the decline of traditional enclosed shopping malls in the 21st Century and consumer trends of the Millennial generation as catalysts behind the redevelopment.

On April 27 of that year, a public meeting was held in a local middle school gymnasium where Eatontown's mayor Dennis Connelly and the Borough Council spoke out against a zoning change that would allow the expansion of the mall.  Several borough residents also spoke out against the redevelopment, and Kushner announced the abandonment of the project at the same meeting.

During this time, Kushner partnered with Rouse Properties (now Brookfield Properties) for the redevelopment. The redevelopment was approved on July 16, 2018. The new plans include opening up the two story mall corridor and creating new outdoor corridors. The plan also includes provisions for the addition of 700 residential apartment units, of which 88 will be designated affordable housing.

References 

Buildings and structures in Monmouth County, New Jersey
Shopping malls in New Jersey
Shopping malls established in 1960
Tourist attractions in Monmouth County, New Jersey
Shopping malls in the New York metropolitan area
Eatontown, New Jersey
1960 establishments in New Jersey